Juan de Zúñiga y Avellaneda, 1st Duke of Peñaranda de Duero  (1551 – 4 September 1608)  was a Spanish nobleman during the reigns of Philip II and Philip III.

He was a Knight of the Military Order of Santiago, the 6th consort count, iure uxoris, of Miranda del Castañar, a title awarded by king Henry IV of Castile on 9 February 1457 and the 1st Duke of Peñaranda, a title awarded by king Philip III on 22 May 1608.

In 1583, under King Philip II, he succeeded Carlo d'Aragona Tagliavia as Viceroy of Catalonia, a position he held until 1586 when he was succeeded by Manrique de Lara y Girón. In 1586, Juan de Zúñiga succeeded Pedro Girón, 1st Duke of Osuna to become the Viceroy of Naples and was succeeded by Enrique de Guzmán, 2nd Count of Olivares in 1595.

He served as President of the Council of Italy and, in 1600–1606, as the President of the Council of Castile, by then at the service of king Philip III of Spain.

External links
Juan de Zuñiga Avellaneda y Bazan, 1. duque de Peñaranda
El conde de Miranda y el duque de Peñaranda.

1551 births
1608 deaths
 
Counts of Spain
Viceroys of Catalonia
Viceroys of Naples
Grandees of Spain